Bhutan competed in the Olympic Games for the first time at the 1984 Summer Olympics in Los Angeles, United States.

Archery

Men

Women

References
Official Olympic Reports

Nations at the 1984 Summer Olympics
1984
Olympics